Kyung-jae, Gyeong-jae, and Kyoung-jae are various Latin-alphabet spellings of a single Korean masculine given name. The meaning differs based on the hanja with which the name is written. There are 54 hanja with the reading "kyung" and 20 hanja with the reading "jae" on the South Korean government's official list of hanja which may be used in given names.

People with this name include:
  (birth name Bak Gyeong-jae; 1948–1988), Japan's first naturalised legislator, who represented the former Tokyo 2nd District
 Lee Kyung-jae (born 1954), ethnic Korean community organiser in Japan
 Yun Gyeong-jae (born 1962), South Korean wrestler
 Myung Kyungjae (born 1968), South Korean biologist
 Kim Kyung-jae ( – 2002), South Korean man who died from thrombosis after a prolonged video gaming session
 Eli Kim (born Kim Kyoungjae, 1991), member of South Korean boy band U-KISS
 Kim Kyung-jae (footballer) (born 1993), South Korean football defender

See also
List of Korean given names

References

Korean masculine given names